Rhys Joseph Jennings Marshall (born 12 October 1992) is a New Zealand rugby union player.

Career in New Zealand

Marshall has international experience with the New Zealand under 20 side, having represented the Junior All Blacks at the 2012 IRB Junior World Championship in South Africa. Following on from the Junior World Cup, he played for Hawke's Bay's Colts team.

In October 2012, it was announced that Marshall was the surprise name in the  squad for the 2013 Super Rugby season as he was still awaiting his ITM Cup debut.   He also went on to sign with Taranaki for 2013.

He started his first Super Rugby game for the Chiefs 41–27 win over the Highlanders. At 20 years of age, Marshall had yet to play ITM Cup rugby, got the callup to start after former All Black Hika Elliot failed a fitness test, and with Mahonri Schwalger also injured, Marshall got the job. In 2013, he signed a contract extension with the Chiefs until 2015.

Marshall returned to New Zealand after 5 years in Ireland, and joined North Harbour ahead of the 2021 National Provincial Championship. He was selected in the  squad for the 2022 Super Rugby Pacific season.

Move to Ireland

On 4 October 2016, it was announced that Marshall would be joining Irish Pro14 side Munster on a three-year contract, which began following the completion of his Mitre 10 Cup commitments with Taranaki. On 4 November 2016, Marshall made his debut for Munster when he came on as a replacement during the 2016–17 Pro12 fixture against Ospreys. On 26 November 2016, Marshall made his first start for Munster during the 46–3 win against Benetton at Thomond Park. Marshall earned the Man-of-the-Match award in Munster's 36–10 win against Ospreys in a 2017–18 Pro14 fixture on 2 December 2017.

He won his 50th cap for Munster on 19 May 2018, doing so when he started against Leinster in the provinces 16–15 Pro14 semi-final defeat. Marshall scored two tries in Munster's 49–13 win against Ospreys on 14 September 2018 in round 3 of the 2018–19 Pro14. He signed a two-year contract extension with Munster in December 2018. Marshall was released by Munster at the end of the 2020–21 season and returned to New Zealand.

References

External links
Munster Profile
Pro14 Profile

1992 births
Living people
People educated at New Plymouth Boys' High School
Rugby union players from New Plymouth
New Zealand rugby union players
Taranaki rugby union players
Chiefs (rugby union) players
Munster Rugby players
North Harbour rugby union players
Waikato rugby union players
Highlanders (rugby union) players
New Zealand expatriate rugby union players
Rugby union hookers